The first cabinet of Alexandru Averescu was the government of Romania from 29 January - 4 March 1918.

Ministers
The ministers of the cabinet were as follows:

President of the Council of Ministers:
Gen. Alexandru Averescu (29 January - 4 March 1918)
Minister of the Interior: 
Constantin Sărățeanu (29 January - 4 March 1918)
Minister of Foreign Affairs: 
(interim) Gen. Alexandru Averescu (29 January - 4 March 1918)
Minister of Finance:
Fotin Enescu (29 January - 4 March 1918)
Minister of Justice:
Constantin Argetoianu (29 January - 4 March 1918)
Minister of Religious Affairs and Public Instruction:
Matei B. Cantacuzino (29 January - 4 March 1918)
Minister of War:
Gen. Constantin Iancovescu (29 January - 4 March 1918)
Minister of War Materiel:
Gen. Constantin Iancovescu (29 January - 5 February 1918)
Minister of Public Works:
Gen. Ion Culcer (29 January - 4 March 1918)
Minister of Industry and Commerce:
Ion Luca-Niculescu (29 January - 4 March 1918)
Minister of Agriculture and Property:
(interim) Fotin Enescu (29 January - 8 February 1918)
Constantin Garoflid (8 - 19 February 1918)
(interim) Fotin Enescu (19 February - 4 March 1918)

Minister without portfolio:
Alexandru Averescu (29 January - 4 March 1918)

References

Cabinets of Romania
Cabinets established in 1918
Cabinets disestablished in 1918
1918 establishments in Romania
1918 disestablishments in Romania
Romania in World War I